El Salto is a Spanish alternative newspaper, with formats both online and offline (in paper). Online, it is a daily newspaper, while in paper it is a monthly newspaper, with 7 different versions depending on the Spanish region. This newspaper was established after the merge of 20 alternative media including Diagonal, the feminist magazine Pikara Magazine or the economist magazine El Salmón Contracorriente.

References 
Citations

Bibliography

External links
 Official website

2017 establishments in Spain
Newspapers established in 2017
Newspapers published in Madrid
Spanish news websites